Conchal is a municipality in São Paulo, Brazil. The population is 28,273 (2020 est.) in an area of 182.8 km². The elevation is 591 m.

References

Municipalities in São Paulo (state)